Aq Kand (also Romanized as Āq Kand; also known as Akhkend and Āq Kandī) is a village in Bughda Kandi Rural District of the Central District of Zanjan County, Zanjan province, Iran. At the 2006 National Census, its population was 1,694 in 400 households. The following census in 2011 counted 1,785 people in 483 households. The latest census in 2016 showed a population of 1,646 people in 480 households; it was the largest village in its rural district.

References 

Zanjan County

Populated places in Zanjan Province

Populated places in Zanjan County